Neckera crispa is a species of moss belonging to the family Neckeraceae.

It is native to Europe and China. In Iceland, it is found at only two locations, growing on palagonite cliffs, and has the conservation status of a vulnerable species (VU).

References

Neckeraceae